Saeed Salarzadeh (born February 13, 1983) is an Iranian footballer who currently plays for Malavan in the Azadegan League.

Club career

Malavan

Salarzadeh had been with Malavan from 2005 to 2013.

Foolad

Salarzadeh joined Foolad for the 2013–14 season.

Club career statistics

 Assist Goals

Honours
Foolad
Iran Pro League (1): 2013–14

References

External links

1983 births
Living people
People from Bandar-e Anzali
Iranian footballers
Malavan players
Foolad FC players
Naft Masjed Soleyman F.C. players
Esteghlal Ahvaz players
Saeid Salarzadeh
Persian Gulf Pro League players
Saeid Salarzadeh
Azadegan League players
Association football defenders
Iranian expatriate footballers
Iranian expatriate sportspeople in Thailand
Expatriate footballers in Thailand
Sportspeople from Gilan province